Saint Dionysios of Zakynthos was a 16th-century Orthodox Christian Archbishop of Aegina. He was born on the Greek island of Zakynthos in 1547. He is the patron saint of Zakynthos (sometimes called Zante in English) and is celebrated on August 24 and December 17.

Biography
In his early life, Dionysios joined a monastery a few miles off the coast of Zakynthos. After a while living there, he was encouraged by his fellow monks to be ordained as a priest, which he did. He eventually decided to travel to the Holy Land by way of Athens. After arriving in Athens, he was made Archbishop of Aigina despite personal protests in humility. In about the year 1589, the Patriarch of Constantinople made Archbishop Dionysios the Archbishop of Zakynthos, he stayed in this position until a permanent Archbishop arrived. After this, he returned to his island monastery where he lived out the rest of his life until his death on December 17, 1622.

References

Sources
St Dionysios of Zakynthos

1546 births
1624 deaths
17th-century Greek clergy
Bishops of the Ecumenical Patriarchate of Constantinople
Eastern Orthodox bishops in Greece
Eastern Orthodox theologians
Greek saints of the Eastern Orthodox Church
People from Zakynthos
Saints of Ottoman Greece
Miracle workers